This page provides the list of all members of the State Council of South Korean President Moon Jae-in.

Timeline

List of Members

Other non-member Attendees

See also
 Cabinet of Park Geun-hye
 Cabinet of Yoon Suk-yeol

References

Government of South Korea
Moon Jae-in Government
Moon Jae-in
Moon Jae-in